This article provides information on candidates who stood for the 2003 New South Wales state election. The election was held on 22 March 2003.

Retiring Members

Labor
 Richard Face MLA (Charlestown)
 Deirdre Grusovin MLA (Heffron)
 Gabrielle Harrison MLA (Parramatta)
 Faye Lo Po' MLA (Penrith)
 Col Markham MLA (Wollongong)
 Ian McManus MLA (Heathcote)
 Kevin Moss MLA (Canterbury)
 John Murray MLA (Drummoyne)
 Ernie Page MLA (Coogee)
 George Thompson MLA (Rockdale)
 Paul Whelan MLA (Strathfield)
 Harry Woods MLA (Clarence)
 Ron Dyer MLC
 Janelle Saffin MLC

Liberal
 Kerry Chikarovski MLA (Lane Cove)
 Peter Collins MLA (Willoughby)
 Ian Glachan MLA (Albury)
 Liz Kernohan MLA (Camden)
 Kevin Rozzoli MLA (Hawkesbury)
 Russell Smith MLA (Bega)
 John Jobling MLC
 Brian Pezzutti MLC
 Jim Samios MLC

Other
 Alan Corbett MLC – A Better Future For Our Children
 Richard Jones MLC – Independent, elected as Democrat
 Helen Sham-Ho MLC – Independent, elected as

Legislative Assembly
Sitting members at the time of the election are shown in bold text. Successful candidates are highlighted in the relevant colour. Where there is possible confusion, an asterisk (*) is also used.

Legislative Council

Sitting members are shown in bold text. Tickets that elected at least one MLC are highlighted in the relevant colour. Successful candidates are identified by an asterisk (*).

See also
 Members of the New South Wales Legislative Assembly, 2003–2007
 Members of the New South Wales Legislative Council, 2003–2007

References
 NSW Electoral Commission - Party Group Results
 Psephos - Adam Carr's Election Archive, New South Wales 2003

2003